Preston Heyman is a British record producer, drummer and percussionist.

He is credited on the Kate Bush album Never for Ever.

He played Oriental percussion instruments on the track "Blood Sucking" of Mike Oldfield's soundtrack for the film The Killing Fields, released in 1984.

He played drums on the single "Wishing Well" from the 1987 album Introducing the Hardline According to Terence Trent D'Arby.

References 

Living people
Musicians from Paterson, New Jersey
British male drummers
British session musicians
Atomic Rooster members
Gonzalez (band) members
Tom Robinson Band members
Toyah (band) members
Year of birth missing (living people)